Vologda-Pristan is an inland river port railway station in Vologda, Russia.

References 

Railway stations in Vologda Oblast